Kahin is a town in the Bagassi Department of Balé Province in southwestern Burkina Faso. The town has a population of 1277.

References

External links
Satellite map at Maplandia.com

Populated places in the Boucle du Mouhoun Region
Balé Province